Michael Ologo Inainfe (born 5 April 2003) is a Nigerian professional footballer who plays as a centre-back for Süper Lig club İstanbulspor.

Career
A youth product of the Nigerian club Fresh Talents Football Academy since 2018, Ologo moved to the TFF First League clubİstanbulspor in the summer of 2018 in a complicated transfer. On his debut season with the club, he helped them earn promotion into the Süper Lig after winning the promotion playoffs. On 8 August 2022, he extended his contract with the club until 2026.

International career
Ologo is a youth international for Nigeria, having played for the Nigeria U23s in October 2022.

References

External links
 
 

2003 births
Living people
People from Bayelsa State
Nigerian footballers
Nigeria youth international footballers
Association football defenders
Süper Lig players
TFF First League players
İstanbulspor footballers
Nigerian expatriate footballers
Nigerian expatriate sportspeople in Turkey
Expatriate footballers in Turkey